
Boric is a chemistry term that refers to substances containing boron, such as:
 boric acid or orthoboric acid, 
 metaboric acid, an acid containing boron, 
 tetraboric acid or pyroboric acid, an acid containing boron, 
 boric oxide, specifically boron trioxide  
 a boric ester, or organic borate

Boric may also refer to:

People
 Borić, a South Slavic surname
 Gabriel Boric (born 1986), Chilean politician of Croatian descent, current President of Chile
 Ban Borić, Ban of Bosnia

Places
Boriç i Madh, Albania
Boriç i Vogël, Albania
a peak in the Crni Vrh (Brod) mountain in Kosovo